Deniyaya is a small town located towards the south of Sri Lanka. It is located in Matara District of the Southern Province. It is surrounded by the Sinharaja rainforest, and the climate is relatively cool. The main source of income is tea cultivation, however people also engage in vegetable cultivation. The village also has many historic temples such as the Gatabaruwa Devalaya.

See also
List of towns in Southern Province, Sri Lanka

External links

Populated places in Southern Province, Sri Lanka